HMCS Arvida was a  that served with the Royal Canadian Navy during the Second World War. She served primarily in the Battle of the Atlantic as a convoy escort. She was named for Arvida, Quebec.

Background

Flower-class corvettes like Arvida serving with the Royal Canadian Navy during the Second World War were different from earlier and more traditional sail-driven corvettes. The "corvette" designation was created by the French as a class of small warships; the Royal Navy borrowed the term for a period but discontinued its use in 1877. During the hurried preparations for war in the late 1930s, Winston Churchill reactivated the corvette class, needing a name for smaller ships used in an escort capacity, in this case based on a whaling ship design. The generic name "flower" was used to designate the class of these ships, which – in the Royal Navy – were named after flowering plants.

Corvettes commissioned by the Royal Canadian Navy during the Second World War were named after communities for the most part, to better represent the people who took part in building them. This idea was put forth by Admiral Percy W. Nelles. Sponsors were commonly associated with the community for which the ship was named. Royal Navy corvettes were designed as open sea escorts, while Canadian corvettes were developed for coastal auxiliary roles which was exemplified by their minesweeping gear. Eventually the Canadian corvettes would be modified to allow them to perform better on the open seas.

Construction
Ordered on 23 January 1940 from Morton Engineering and Dry Dock Co. as part of the 1939–1940 Flower-class building program, Arvida was laid down on 28 February. She was launched on 21 September 1940 and commissioned at Quebec City on 22 May 1941. During her career she had two major refits, the first between December 1942 and March 1943 at Lunenberg and Saint John. The second took place in Baltimore, Maryland from January to April 1944 where her fo'c'sle was extended.

War service
After workups Arvida was assigned to Sydney Force in July 1941 and escorted coastal convoys until September. In September she was reassigned to Newfoundland Command and was used as an ocean escort continuously until the end of 1943. During this time she took in three major convoy battles, ONS 92 in May 1942, ON 127 in September 1942 and SC 107 in November 1942. During ONS 127 she rescued survivors from the sinking  which had been hit by two torpedoes. Convoy SC 107 was such a disaster that it contributed to Canadian escorts being pulled out as ocean escorts. While escorting convoy ON 188 in mid-June 1943, Arvida was damaged by her own detonating depth charges. She spent a week repairing in Iceland.

After her second major refit she was assigned to the Western Local Escort Force as part of escort group W-7. In August of that year Arvida was reassigned to group W-2. December 1944 saw her transferred to group W-8 with whom she would remain until the end of the war.

Post-war career
Arvida was paid off on 14 June 1945 at Sorel, Quebec. She was sold for mercantile purposes. The ship was converted to a cargo ship in 1950 with a gross register tonnage of 1,117 tons. She was in service in 1950 as La Ceiba under a Spanish-flag. She was last registered on Lloyd's Register in 1953–1954. In 1957, she was renamed Rio Samo and broken up in Spain in 1987.

Notes

External links

Ships of the Royal Canadian Navy
Flower-class corvettes of the Royal Canadian Navy
1940 ships